The Mateni class (マテニ) locomotives were a class of steam tender locomotives of the Chosen Government Railway (Sentetsu) with 4-8-2 wheel arrangement. The "Mate" name came from the American naming system for steam locomotives, under which locomotives with 4-8-2 wheel arrangement were called "Mountain".

Description
Designed by Sentetsu, the Mateni class was designed for long-distance freight and passenger trains on steep lines; shipments increased with the higher speeds offered by these locomotives. A total of 33 were built from 1943 through 1945, all by Kawasaki. In addition, the locomotives were equipped with automatic stokers and economisers to improve boiler efficiency. In addition to being used for heavy freight trains, they were also used on passenger trains, and was the last type of locomotive designed by Sentetsu.

Postwar
After the Liberation and subsequent partition of Korea, both the Korean National Railroad (KNR) in the South and the Korean State Railway (Kukch'ŏl) in the North operated 4-8-2s inherited from Sentetsu. Of the 83 locomotives that were built of both the Mateni and Matei classes, only 77 remained in 1946; of these, 33 went to the Korean National Railroad in the South, and 44 to the Korean State Railway in the North, though none of the ones operated by the KNR are known for certain to have been of the Mateni class. The six locomotives of both classes that remain unaccounted for were likely either destroyed during the Pacific War or were possibly taken by Soviet Army, which during its occupation of North Korea took a large number of locomotives back to the USSR.

The bulk of the Mateni class likely ended up in North Korea with the Korean State Railway, where they were initially designated 마더두 class (Madŏdu), and around the 1970s renumbered in the 7200 series. In 2003 an out-of-service Mateni was still parked at Sinuiju.

Additionally, a Mateni was completed by Kawasaki in 1946 and delivered to the KNR as 마터2-34.

References

Locomotives of Korea
Locomotives of North Korea
Locomotives of South Korea
Railway locomotives introduced in 1943
4-8-2 locomotives
Kawasaki locomotives